Ogrohayon ( Ôgrôhayôn), alternately spelled Agrahayan, is the eighth month of the Bengali calendar. It is the second of the two months that make up the dry season, locally called "Hemanta" ( Hemôntô). It is commonly believed that this month is very auspicious for marriage.

Festival 
The first day of the month is the Nabanna harvest festival.

Events 
 Mahesh Chandra Nyayratna Bhattacharyya was born 17 Agrahayan in 1265.

References 

Months of the Bengali calendar